William W. Kirksey Jr. (born January 29, 1966) is a former American football linebacker. Undrafted out of college, he played nine games for the Minnesota Vikings in 1990. He moved on to the WLAF's London Monarchs, and later returned to the NFL for a stint with the Kansas City Chiefs.

Kirksey played college football at Southern Mississippi, where he was a defensive team captain in 1989, and led the team in tackles (146).

After his playing career, he became a defensive line coach at Northwest College, and later a linebackers coach at Coahoma Community College.

References 

1966 births
Living people
Players of American football from Birmingham, Alabama
American football linebackers
Southern Miss Golden Eagles football players
Minnesota Vikings players
London Monarchs players

He counties his career working at Lake Cormorant Middle School. 
Teaching many young people his skills.